Acyl-protein thioesterase 1 is an enzyme that in humans is encoded by the LYPLA1 gene.

Lysophospholipases are enzymes that act on biological membranes to regulate the multifunctional lysophospholipids. The protein encoded by this gene hydrolyzes lysophosphatidylcholine in both monomeric and micellar forms. The use of alternate polyadenylation sites has been found for this gene. There are alternatively spliced transcript variants described for this gene but the full length nature is not known yet.

References

Further reading

Lysophospholipases